Malaysia Airlines operates a fleet of Airbus A330 and A350 as well as Boeing 737 aircraft.

Current fleet

, Malaysia Airlines (excluding its subsidiaries Firefly and MASwings) operates the following aircraft:

Aircraft types

Airbus A330-200
Malaysia Airlines has leased six Airbus A330-200s, used for several high-demand medium haul routes. The aircraft are secondhand and have kept the configuration of their previous operator (Air Berlin), this being 19 Business Class seats and 268 Economy Class seats. The airline previously operated five 'older generation' A330-200s between 2003 and 2013. The aircraft is set to be replaced and retired by the Airbus A330-900.

Airbus A330-300
Malaysia Airlines' Airbus A330-300 fleet is used to fly medium-to-long-haul routes.They are painted in the new livery and are also equipped with enhanced in-flight features, as part of the airline's fleet renewal programme. The first of these new A330s arrived in 2011. Malaysia Airlines previously operated 13 'older generation' A330-300s, receiving its first in 1995. All of them have since been retired from the fleet. The aircraft is set to be retired and replaced by the Airbus A330-900.

Airbus A330-900
In August 2022, Malaysia Airlines confirmed it would take delivery of an initial order of 20 Airbus A330neo aircraft, with purchase options for an additional 20, to gradually replace its A330-200 and A330-300 aircraft between Q3 2024 and 2028 for flights across Asia, the Pacific and the Middle East. The deliveries are set to be split between 10 direct purchases and 10 leases from Ireland's Avolon.

Airbus A350-900
Malaysia Airlines began taking delivery of six Airbus A350-900 aircraft, leased from Air Lease Corporation in 2017 to replace the ageing Boeing 777-200ER fleet, and was the first A350-900 operator to offer First Class. They are configured to accommodate 4 seats in First Class, 35 seats in Business Class and 247 seats in Economy Class (286 seats in total) after MAB CEO, Peter Bellew said premium economy seats "would erode our business product and revenues". On 12 December 2018, First Class was rebranded as Business Suite Class.

Boeing 737-800
The first order for the 737-800 was first announced at the Farnborough Air Show on 16 July 2008. In February 2009, Malaysia Airlines received two leased 737-800s in advance of its aircraft. Boeing 737-800s currently account for the majority of aircraft under Malaysia Airlines and are primarily assigned to flights to regional Southeast Asian and domestic destinations.

Boeing 737 MAX
In July 2016, Malaysia Airlines placed an order for 25 MAX 8s and 25 options with Boeing at a cost of slightly over US$2 billion. Ten out of the original 25 MAX 8 orders have been converted to the larger MAX 10s. Delivery is scheduled to start in 2024 after several setbacks from 2019.

Historical fleet
Malaysia Airlines and its predecessor companies have flown the following aircraft types in the past:

Future fleet 
In July 2022, Malaysia Airlines was reportedly in talks for a $10 billion order of 30 either Airbus A330neo or Boeing 787 Dreamliner planes.

As of August 2022, it was reported that Malaysia Airlines is poised to announce a deal to acquire 20 Airbus A330neo wide-body jets.

References

External links 

Fleet
Lists of aircraft by operator